Getta ennia is a moth of the family Notodontidae first described by Herbert Druce in 1899. It is found in the Amazon basin, including Peru.

External links
"Getta ennia Druce 1899". Tree of Life Web Project. Retrieved December 28, 2019.

Notodontidae of South America
Moths described in 1899